Roman Igorevich Gavryush (born 31 August 1983) is a former Russian professional football player.

Club career
He played 4 seasons in the Russian Football National League for FC Chita.

References

External links
 

1983 births
Living people
Russian footballers
Association football midfielders
FC Chita players